Five and the Skin is a 1982 French drama film directed by Pierre Rissient. It was screened in the Un Certain Regard section at the 1982 Cannes Film Festival.

Cast
 Féodor Atkine - Ivan
 Eiko Matsuda - Mari
 Gloria Diaz
 Bembol Roco - Bembol (as Rafael Roco)
 Phillip Salvador - Carding
 Louie Pascua - Dencar
 Joel Lamangan
 Roberto Padua
 Maila Marcello
 Stella Ruiz
 Jenny Decolongon
 Maki Matsumoto - Maki
 Menchu Menchaca
 Tess Galang
 Chat Silayan

References

External links

1982 films
1980s French-language films
1982 drama films
Films shot in the Philippines
French drama films
1980s French films